Jan Gyamerah (born 18 June 1995) is a German professional footballer who plays as a right-back for  club 1. FC Nürnberg.

Early life
Gyamerah was born in 1995, the son of Ghanaian Stephen Gyamerah who came to Berlin to study in 1989 and whose German wife was born in Berlin. Born on a Sunday, he received the African nickname "Kwasi" (Asante for Sunday). In 1999, the family moved to Stadthagen, Lower Saxony, where his sister, Yvonne, was born.

Club career

VfL Bochum
Gyamerah first played for local club FC Stadthagen, before, via Arminia Bielefeld, moving to the youth department of VfL Bochum in January 2011. There, he progressed through the various youth teams and made his professional debut on 20 December 2013 in the 2. Bundesliga, when he came on as a substitute in the 66th minute for Danny Latza.

Hamburger SV
On 14 February 2019, Gyamerah signed a three-year contract starting from the 2019–20 season with league rivals Hamburger SV. Under head coach Dieter Hecking, Gyamerah immediately established himself in the starting lineup. On 11 September 2019, he contracted a calf fracture during practice and had to undergo surgery. During his absence, Josha Vagnoman took over the right back position, before he also fell out with a long-term injury, with Khaled Narey becoming the third player during the season to cover the position. After the winter break, newcomer Jordan Beyer, who had been loaned from first-placed Bundesliga club Borussia Mönchengladbach due to Gyamerah's and Vagnoman's injuries until the end of the season, was positioned as right back. 

At the beginning of March 2020, Gyamerah returned to team practice. On the 26th matchday, which was regularly scheduled for 13 March 2020, Gyamerah was again selected for the matchday squad. However, the season was interrupted on the same day due to the COVID-19 pandemic. In early May, he suffered a muscle injury in the hip during the season break and missed the resumption of playing activities about a week later. About a month later, Gyamerah returned to the matchday squad on the 30th matchday and made his first appearance in months in the following match, when he came on as a substitute. Before the end of the season, three more league appearances followed. Gyamerah made nine 2. Bundesliga appearances during his first season at the club.

Nürnberg
On 10 June 2022, Gyamerah signed with 1. FC Nürnberg.

International career
Gyamerah was born in Germany and is of Ghanaian descent. He was a youth international for Germany.

Career statistics

References

External links

1995 births
Living people
German footballers
Germany youth international footballers
German sportspeople of Ghanaian descent
Footballers from Berlin
Association football defenders
VfL Bochum II players
VfL Bochum players
Hamburger SV players
1. FC Nürnberg players
2. Bundesliga players
Hamburger SV II players
Regionalliga players